E.C. Collier  is a Chesapeake Bay skipjack, built in 1910 at Deal Island, Maryland. She is a  two-sail bateau, or "V"-bottomed deadrise type of centerboard sloop. She is one of the 35 surviving traditional Chesapeake Bay skipjacks and a member of the last commercial sailing fleet in the United States. At the time of her documentation on the National Register of Historic Places she was located at Tilghman, Talbot County, Maryland. She is now a permanent exhibit at the Chesapeake Bay Maritime Museum in Saint Michaels, Maryland.

She was listed on the National Register of Historic Places in 1985. She is assigned Maryland dredge number 7.

References

External links
 Oystering on the Chesapeake permanent exhibit at the Chesapeake Bay Maritime Museum, including the E.C. Collier

Ships in Talbot County, Maryland
Skipjacks
Ships on the National Register of Historic Places in Maryland
1910 ships
National Register of Historic Places in Talbot County, Maryland
Chesapeake Bay Maritime Museum